Alt-Signau Castle is a ruined castle in the municipality of Bowil in the canton of Bern in Switzerland.

History 
The castle was the ancestral home of the Barons of Signau.  The family was first mentioned in 1130 when Werner von Signau appeared in a historical record.
The castle was designed to protect and control the road between the Emmental and the Aare river.
In the mid-14th century the castle was abandoned when the family moved to Neu-Signau Castle on a hill across the valley.

The ruin is relatively well preserved.

See also
 List of castles in Switzerland

References

 Burgenkarte der Schweiz - West: , Bundesamt für Landestopografie swisstopo, 2007

External links

 
 History of Signau from signau.ch

Castles in the Canton of Bern